Wayne Wang (born January 12, 1949) is a Hong Kong–born American director, producer, and screenwriter. Considered a pioneer of Asian-American cinema, he was one of the first Chinese-American filmmakers to gain a major foothold in Hollywood. His films, often independently produced, deal with issues of contemporary Asian-American culture and domestic life.  

His best known works include Dim Sum: A Little Bit of Heart (1985), Eat a Bowl of Tea (1989), the Amy Tan literary adaptation The Joy Luck Club (1993), Chinese Box (1997), and A Thousand Years of Good Prayers (2007). Other films include the Harvey Keitel and William Hurt–starring comedy Smoke (1995), the family film Because of Winn-Dixie (2005), the romantic comedies Maid in Manhattan (2002) and Last Holiday (2006), and the controversial erotic drama The Center of the World (2001). 

He is the recipient of numerous accolades, including a Bodil Award, a Silver Bear, two Golden Shells, with BAFTA Award, Sundance Grand Jury, Golden Lion, and César Award nominations.

Biography
Wang was born and raised in Hong Kong, and named after his father's favorite movie star, John Wayne. When he was 17, his parents arranged for him to move to the United States to study, to prepare for medical school. Wang, however, soon put this plan aside when his 'eyes were completely opened' by new experience, and as he turned to the arts, studying film and television at California College of Arts and Crafts in Oakland.

After graduating from film school, Wang taught English to new immigrants in Chinatown.

Chan Is Missing (1982), Dim Sum: A Little Bit of Heart (1985), and Eat a Bowl of Tea (1989) established his reputation. He is best known for The Joy Luck Club (1993), Maid in Manhattan (2002), and the independent features Smoke (1995) and Anywhere but Here (1999). At the 2007 Toronto International Film Festival, Wang premiered two feature films,  A Thousand Years of Good Prayers and The Princess of Nebraska,  as well as appearing in the Arthur Dong documentary film Hollywood Chinese.

He won the Golden Shell at the San Sebastian Film Festival in September 2007 for A Thousand Years of Good Prayers.

In 2016, he won a Lifetime Achievement Award at the San Diego Asian Film Festival.

Personal life
He is married to former Miss Hong Kong and actress Cora Miao, and lives in San Francisco and New York City.

Filmography

References

External links

 
 Interview with Wayne Wang October 2011 at subtitledonline.com
 "New look of Asian American films / Festival opens with edgy 'Better Luck Tomorrow,' honors 'Chan Is Missing, San Francisco Chronicle

1949 births
Living people
American film directors of Hong Kong descent
American film editors
American film producers
American male screenwriters
Hong Kong film producers
Film directors from California
California College of the Arts alumni
Hong Kong emigrants to the United States
Chinese emigrants to the United States
Writers from New York City
Writers from the San Francisco Bay Area
Film directors from New York City
Screenwriters from California
Screenwriters from New York (state)